Dave Shyiak (born November 4, 1966) is a former Canadian ice hockey player and coach. He was part of Northern Michigan's national title run in the 1991 tournament.

Career
The Brandon, Manitoba native began his college career as a freshman under Rick Comley at Northern Michigan. Shyiak's term as a player for the Wildcats coincided with high point for the team winning 20 games in three consecutive seasons, making two NCAA Tournaments and winning their only national title in his senior year. After graduating Shyiak spent one more season playing in the BHL before returning to Marquette. Shyiak spent the 1992–93 season as a graduate assistant for his former team and then moved on to become the head coach for the Kimberley Dynamiters the following year. He move again the next season to become the head coach/assistant GM for the Merritt Centennials for one year before returning to his alma mater as a full-time assistant coach.

Shyiak spent a decade as an assistant at Northern Michigan, serving under both his former coach and his successor Walt Kyle until he was offered the top job at Alaska-Anchorage. Shyiak took over the Seawolves in 2005-06 and while the team demonstrated some promise he could not get the club to have a single winning season during his eight-year tenure (something Alaska-Anchorage has struggled with since joining the WCHA). After his contract expired following the 2012-13 season he was not retained, making room for Matt Thomas to succeed him as coach.

Since his dismissal Shyiak signed on as an amateur scout with the Toronto Maple Leafs for one season. He was named associate head coach of the Western Michigan men's ice hockey team on Sept. 15, 2014.

Career statistics

Head coaching record

References

External links

1966 births
Living people
Alaska Anchorage Seawolves men's ice hockey coaches
Canadian ice hockey coaches
Sportspeople from Brandon, Manitoba
Toronto Maple Leafs scouts
Ice hockey people from Manitoba
NCAA men's ice hockey national champions